Opostega orophoxantha is a moth of the family Opostegidae. It was described by Edward Meyrick in 1921. It is known from Umtali, Zimbabwe.

References

Endemic fauna of Zimbabwe
Opostegidae
Lepidoptera of Zimbabwe
Moths of Sub-Saharan Africa
Moths described in 1921